A list of films produced by the Tollywood (Bengali language film industry) based in Kolkata in the year 1990.

A-Z of films

References

External links
 Tollywood films of 1990 at the Internet Movie Database

1990
Bengali
 Bengali
1990 in Indian cinema